USS Cozy (SP-556) was a United States Navy patrol vessel in commission from 1917 to 1918.

Cozy was built as a wooden-hulled civilian working motorboat of the same name by L. P. Trader.  On 15 November 1917, the U.S. Navy chartered her from her owner, Harry N. Collins of Franklin City, Virginia, for use as a section patrol vessel during World War I. She was commissioned as USS Cozy (SP-556) on 30 November 1917.

Assigned to the 5th Naval District, Cozy served on patrol duties for the rest of World War I.

Cozy was decommissioned in December 1918 and returned to Collins on 20 December 1918.

Notes

References

Department of the Navy Naval History and Heritage Command Online Library of Selected Images: Civilian Ships: Cozy (American Motor Boat). Served as USS Cozy (SP-556) in 1917–1918
NavSource Online: Section Patrol Craft Photo Archive: Cozy (SP 556)

Patrol vessels of the United States Navy
World War I patrol vessels of the United States